Carlos Coolidge (June 25, 1792 – August 15, 1866) was an American Whig politician, a lawyer, a Vermont State Representative, the Speaker of the Vermont House, a State Senator, and the 19th governor of Vermont.

Biography
Coolidge was born in Windsor, Vermont, in 1792. He attended the schools of Windsor, and studied with Reverend James Converse of Weathersfield in preparation for attending college. He began studies at Dartmouth College, transferred to Middlebury College in 1809, and graduated with honors in 1811. He studied law with Peter Starr of Middlebury, and then with Jonathan H. Hubbard of Windsor, attained admission to the bar, and began a practice in Windsor in 1814. Coolidge was active well into his old age, and practiced for more than fifty years. On September 22, 1817, Coolidge married Harriet Bingham and the couple had two daughters, Mary and Harriet. Mary Coolidge (1818–1875) was the wife of Reverend Franklin Butler (1814–1880). Harriet (1826–1831) died at the age of 5.

Career
In 1816, Coolidge was commissioned as a captain in the Vermont Militia, and assigned to 1st Regiment, 4th Division. He remained in the militia for several years, and advanced to colonel and commander of the regiment.

Coolidge was one of the first members of the state Board of Bank Commissioners. He was elected State's Attorney for Windsor County and served from 1831 until 1836. He was a Representative in the Vermont House from 1834 to 1837, and served as Speaker from 1836 to 1837. He served in the House again from 1839 to 1842, and was again Speaker of the House. In 1835 he received an honorary Master of Arts degree from the University of Vermont.

Coolidge was one of Vermont's presidential electors in 1844, and cast his ballot for Henry Clay and Theodore Frelinghuysen. He served as President of the Vermont Whig Convention in 1847, which passed resolutions opposing the Mexican–American War and the acquisition of territory by conquest, and in favor of the Wilmot Proviso. Coolidge's anti-slavery views also included the idea of returning freed slaves to Africa as settlers, and he was active in both the American Colonization Society and the Vermont Colonization Society.

Coolidge served two terms as Governor of Vermont from October 1, 1848, to October 11, 1850. During his tenure, a Supreme Court and Circuit Court System was established. He received an honorary LL.D. degree from Middlebury College in 1849.

After serving as Governor Coolidge returned to his law practice in Windsor. He became a Republican when the party was founded in the 1850s, and served in the Vermont State Senate from 1853 to 1857, after which he again returned to his law practice.

Death
Coolidge died in Windsor, Vermont, on August 15, 1866, and is interred in Windsor's Old South Church Cemetery. He was a distant relative of Calvin Coolidge.

References

External links
 The Political Graveyard
 History of Windsor County, Vermont
 
 National Governors Association

1792 births
1866 deaths
People from Windsor, Vermont
Middlebury College alumni
Vermont lawyers
State's attorneys in Vermont
Vermont Whigs
Republican Party members of the Vermont House of Representatives
Governors of Vermont
Speakers of the Vermont House of Representatives
Vermont state senators
Presidents pro tempore of the Vermont Senate
Burials in Vermont
Whig Party state governors of the United States
19th-century American politicians
Coolidge family
19th-century American lawyers